Mirjam Liimask (born 25 October 1983 in Tartu) is a retired Estonian hurdler. She became the European U23 champion in 2005.

Competition record

References

External links

1983 births
Living people
Estonian female hurdlers
Sportspeople from Tartu
Universiade medalists in athletics (track and field)
Universiade gold medalists for Estonia
Medalists at the 2005 Summer Universiade